Moscow City Duma District 1 is one of 45 constituencies in Moscow City Duma. The constituency has covered all of Zelenograd since 2014. From 1993-2014 District 1 also was based in Central Moscow (it actually overlapped the entirety of State Duma Central constituency in 2005-2014).

Members elected

Election results

2001

|-
! colspan=2 style="background-color:#E9E9E9;text-align:left;vertical-align:top;" |Candidate
! style="background-color:#E9E9E9;text-align:left;vertical-align:top;" |Party
! style="background-color:#E9E9E9;text-align:right;" |Votes
! style="background-color:#E9E9E9;text-align:right;" |%
|-
|style="background-color:"|
|align=left|Sergey Goncharov (incumbent)
|align=left|Independent
|
|48.63%
|-
|style="background-color:"|
|align=left|Natalia Borodina
|align=left|Yabloko
|
|22.61%
|-
|style="background-color:"|
|align=left|Sergey Bocharov
|align=left|Independent
|
|12.77%
|-
|style="background-color:"|
|align=left|Pavel Tertsiyev
|align=left|Liberal Democratic Party
|
|1.58%
|-
|style="background-color:#000000"|
|colspan=2 |against all
|
|11.66%
|-
| colspan="5" style="background-color:#E9E9E9;"|
|- style="font-weight:bold"
| colspan="3" style="text-align:left;" | Total
| 
| 100%
|-
| colspan="5" style="background-color:#E9E9E9;"|
|- style="font-weight:bold"
| colspan="4" |Source:
|
|}

2005

|-
! colspan=2 style="background-color:#E9E9E9;text-align:left;vertical-align:top;" |Candidate
! style="background-color:#E9E9E9;text-align:left;vertical-align:top;" |Party
! style="background-color:#E9E9E9;text-align:right;" |Votes
! style="background-color:#E9E9E9;text-align:right;" |%
|-
|style="background-color:"|
|align=left|Inna Svyatenko (incumbent)
|align=left|United Russia
|
|41.68%
|-
|style="background-color:"|
|align=left|Yelena Lukyanova
|align=left|Communist Party
|
|25.90%
|-
|style="background-color:"|
|align=left|Yury Novikov
|align=left|Independent
|
|18.22%
|-
|style="background-color:"|
|align=left|Aleksandr Russky
|align=left|Independent
|
|4.76%
|-
|style="background-color:"|
|align=left|Aleksey Folvarkov
|align=left|Liberal Democratic Party
|
|3.43%
|-
| colspan="5" style="background-color:#E9E9E9;"|
|- style="font-weight:bold"
| colspan="3" style="text-align:left;" | Total
| 
| 100%
|-
| colspan="5" style="background-color:#E9E9E9;"|
|- style="font-weight:bold"
| colspan="4" |Source:
|
|}

2009

|-
! colspan=2 style="background-color:#E9E9E9;text-align:left;vertical-align:top;" |Candidate
! style="background-color:#E9E9E9;text-align:left;vertical-align:top;" |Party
! style="background-color:#E9E9E9;text-align:right;" |Votes
! style="background-color:#E9E9E9;text-align:right;" |%
|-
|style="background-color:"|
|align=left|Inna Svyatenko (incumbent)
|align=left|United Russia
|
|66.33%
|-
|style="background-color:"|
|align=left|Aleksandr Pavlov
|align=left|Communist Party
|
|15.70%
|-
|style="background-color:"|
|align=left|Natalia Borodina
|align=left|A Just Russia
|
|7.81%
|-
|style="background-color:"|
|align=left|Sergey Basalay
|align=left|Liberal Democratic Party
|
|4.45%
|-
|style="background-color:"|
|align=left|Nikolay Seleznev
|align=left|Independent
|
|2.90%
|-
| colspan="5" style="background-color:#E9E9E9;"|
|- style="font-weight:bold"
| colspan="3" style="text-align:left;" | Total
| 
| 100%
|-
| colspan="5" style="background-color:#E9E9E9;"|
|- style="font-weight:bold"
| colspan="4" |Source:
|
|}

2014

|-
! colspan=2 style="background-color:#E9E9E9;text-align:left;vertical-align:top;" |Candidate
! style="background-color:#E9E9E9;text-align:left;vertical-align:top;" |Party
! style="background-color:#E9E9E9;text-align:right;" |Votes
! style="background-color:#E9E9E9;text-align:right;" |%
|-
|style="background-color:"|
|align=left|Zinaida Dragunkina
|align=left|United Russia
|
|44.15%
|-
|style="background-color:"|
|align=left|Grigory Goncharuk
|align=left|Communist Party
|
|14.84%
|-
|style="background-color:"|
|align=left|Artur Aleksanyan
|align=left|Civic Platform
|
|13.38%
|-
|style="background-color:"|
|align=left|Aleksandr Venediktov
|align=left|A Just Russia
|
|11.84%
|-
|style="background-color:"|
|align=left|Aleksandr Butuzov
|align=left|Liberal Democratic Party
|
|7.74%
|-
|style="background-color:"|
|align=left|Maksim Bolotin
|align=left|Yabloko
|
|4.62%
|-
| colspan="5" style="background-color:#E9E9E9;"|
|- style="font-weight:bold"
| colspan="3" style="text-align:left;" | Total
| 
| 100%
|-
| colspan="5" style="background-color:#E9E9E9;"|
|- style="font-weight:bold"
| colspan="4" |Source:
|
|}

2019

|-
! colspan=2 style="background-color:#E9E9E9;text-align:left;vertical-align:top;" |Candidate
! style="background-color:#E9E9E9;text-align:left;vertical-align:top;" |Party
! style="background-color:#E9E9E9;text-align:right;" |Votes
! style="background-color:#E9E9E9;text-align:right;" |%
|-
|style="background-color:"|
|align=left|Andrey Titov
|align=left|Independent
|
|38.76%
|-
|style="background-color:"|
|align=left|Ivan Ulyanchenko
|align=left|Communist Party
|
|34.03%
|-
|style="background-color:"|
|align=left|Svetlana Nikitushkina
|align=left|A Just Russia
|
|8.17%
|-
|style="background-color:"|
|align=left|Olga Zhagina
|align=left|Communists of Russia
|
|8.00%
|-
|style="background-color:"|
|align=left|Vyacheslav Milovanov
|align=left|Liberal Democratic Party
|
|7.58%
|-
| colspan="5" style="background-color:#E9E9E9;"|
|- style="font-weight:bold"
| colspan="3" style="text-align:left;" | Total
| 
| 100%
|-
| colspan="5" style="background-color:#E9E9E9;"|
|- style="font-weight:bold"
| colspan="4" |Source:
|
|}

Notes

References

Moscow City Duma districts